Ilie Vancea (26 January 1949 – 26 March 2021) was a Moldovan politician. He served as Minister of Education from 2000 to 2002.

References

1949 births
2021 deaths
Moldovan Ministers of Education
People from Cahul District